Click Commerce, Inc. is a research software company based in Hillsboro, Oregon, United States. Incorporated in 1996 as Click Interactive, Inc. in Chicago, Illinois, the company historically supplied business application software and related services.

History
Click Commerce was founded by Michael W. Ferro, Jr., Jim Heising, and Sarah O'Donnell  and was incorporated in 1996 as Click Interactive, Incorporated. The company changed its name to Click Commerce, Inc. in 1999 and went public on NASDAQ in June, 2000 under the symbol CKCM. In 2004, Click purchased Oregon based Webridge, a privately held software developer that marketed tr compliance related software to research universities. Click Commerce retained Webridge's office in Oregon along with part of that company's staff.

In October 2006, the company was acquired by Illinois Tool Works (ITW) and operated as an independent business unit until May 15, 2009, when Marlin Equity Partners acquired three software operating units from ITW. The transaction included the Service Network Solutions (“SNS”) and Research and Healthcare Solutions (“RHS”) businesses and the rights to the Click Commerce, Inc. name.  Additionally, the Contract Service and Management (“CSM”) business was also acquired but merged into Emptoris, an existing Marlin portfolio company based in Burlington, Massachusetts, specializing in supply management and contract management software.  Click Commerce’s eCommerce and Channel Management Division was retained by ITW and is doing business as Requisite Technology, Inc.

Marlin Equity Partners subsequently acquired Servigistics, a strategic service management company headquartered in Atlanta, Georgia, and on July 7, 2009 announced its merger with Click Commerce’s Service Network Solutions (SNS) unit. In November 2010, Click Commerce was purchased by Huron Consulting Group, but retained its software development and services site in Oregon.

Operations

The Research and Healthcare Division retained the Click Commerce name, and is headquartered in the Portland metropolitan area of Oregon. Specializing in the business of research, their eResearch Portal includes: 
 
Institutional Review Boards (IRB) 
Grants and Contracts
SF424 
Conflict of interest
Clinical Trials Billing
Institutional Animal Care and Use Committees (IACUC)
Institutional Biosafety Committees (IBC)
Animal Operations
Effort Reporting
Safety Committees

See also
 List of companies based in Oregon

References

Companies based in Hillsboro, Oregon
Companies established in 1996
Companies disestablished in 2006
1996 establishments in Illinois
2006 mergers and acquisitions
2009 mergers and acquisitions
2010 mergers and acquisitions